Beatrice de Frangepan (Croatian: Beatrica Frankopan, Hungarian: Frangepán Beatrix), (1480 – c. 27 March 1510) was a Croatian noblewoman, a member of the House of Frankopan that lived in the Kingdom of Croatia in personal union with Hungary. By marriage she was heiress of Hunyad Castle and Margravine of Brandenburg-Ansbach.

Life 
Beatrice Frangipani was a daughter of Bernardin Frankopan, Knez (Prince) of Krk and Modruš (1453–1529) from his marriage to Donna Luisa Marzano d'Aragona, daughter of Giovanni Francesco Marino Marzano, Prince of Squillace.  Her brother Christoph Frankopan (1482–1527) was Ban (Viceroy) of Croatia under the reign of the Hungarian king John Zápolya.

Beatrice first married in 1496 to John Corvinus (1473–1504), an illegitimate son of King Matthias Corvinus of Hungary, with whom she had three children:
 Elisabeth (1496–1508).
 Christoph (1499–1505), the last of the House of Hunyadi Corvinus.
 Matthias (1504–1505).

She was described as extremely beautiful and after her husband's death she inherited Hunyad Castle and she administered her children's estates.  However, they both died young (probably poisoned), soon after their father.  

After the mourning period, King Vladislaus II of Hungary had her married to his nephew, the Hohenzollern prince George of Brandenburg-Ansbach (1484–1543), on 21 January 1509 in Gyula.  King Vladislav transferred all of the Corvinus property to George.  Apart from Hunyad Castle, this included, among others, the fortress of Lipova with 252 villages. Through his wife, George became one of the most powerful landowners in Hungary, though he had to cope with border disputes with the rivalling Szapolyai dynasty.  Parts of the Bibliotheca Corviniana ended up in Wolfenbüttel, due to Beatrice.

After Beatrice's death, only one year after the marriage, George sold the bulk of the Hungarian possessions and purchased several Silesian duchies instead.

See also
History of Hungary
Matthias Corvinus

References 
 Nepomuki Janos Mailath: history of the Magyars, 1852, p. 305 (digitized)

Further reading

For the family of the Counts Frangipani of Dalmatia e Croatia, counts of di Veglae, Modrussae e Vinodol, for the legitims heirs and descendants see the family Damiani di Vergada Gliubavaz Frangipani (Frankopan) Detrico si veda:

 Friederich Heyer von Rosenfield (1873), "Counts Frangipani or Frankopanovich conts of Vegliae, Segniae, Modrussa, Vinodol or Damiani di Vergada Gliubavaz Frangipani (Frankopan) Detrico", in: Wappenbuch: Der Adel des Königreichs Dalmatien, Volume 4, part 3 (in German). Nürnberg: Bauer und Raspe, p. 44.

 Friederich Heyer von Rosenfield (1873), "Counts Frangipani or Frankopanovich or Damiani di Vergada Gliubavaz Frangipani (Frankopan) Detrico", in: Wappenbuch: Der Adel des Königreichs Dalmatien, Volume 4, part 3 (in German). Nürnberg: Bauer und Raspe, p. 45.

 Friederich Heyer von Rosenfield (1873), "Coats of arms of Counts Frangipani or Frankopanovich or Damiani di Vergada Gliubavaz Frangipani (Frankopan) Detrico", in: Wappenbuch: Der Adel des Königreichs Dalmatien, Volume 4, part 3 (in German). Nürnberg: Bauer und Raspe, taf. 30.

 Victor Anton Duisin (1938), "Counts Damjanić Vrgadski Frankopan Ljubavac Detrico", in: "Zbornik Plemstva" (in Croatian). Zagreb: Tisak Djela i Grbova, p. 155-156. 

 "Counts Damjanić Vrgadski Frankopan Ljubavac Detrico" in: (in Croatian). Zagreb: on line.

1480 births
1510 deaths
15th-century Croatian people
Beatrice
Hunyadi family
15th-century Croatian nobility
16th-century Croatian nobility
Croatian people of Italian descent
15th-century Croatian women